James Arthur Beard (born August 26, 1960 in Philadelphia) is an American jazz pianist and keyboardist, composer, arranger and producer who has worked with Wayne Shorter, John McLaughlin, Pat Metheny, John Scofield, Mike Stern, Dennis Chambers and Bob Berg, among others.

Music career

Education
Beard was born in Philadelphia and developed a keen interest in music from an early age. He first wanted to play tuba (at age 5), then drums and saxophone. His parents decided that he should start with the piano and move to the other instruments later. He began with piano at age seven and his classical teacher for almost twelve years was Mary Anne Rietz. As a teenager, he studied arranging with Don Sebesky, jazz piano with Roland Hanna,  and studied privately with George Shearing for several years. He credits as strong influences during his teens: Oscar Peterson, George Shearing, Erroll Garner and The Thad Jones/Mel Lewis Orchestra as well as Elton John, the Beatles, Stevie Wonder, Steely Dan, and Earth, Wind & Fire. He also studied clarinet, saxophone, and double bass before the age of 15.

Beard took his first overseas tour at the age of sixteen with the American Youth Jazz Orchestra under the direction of Hal Schiff. He attended Indiana University, studying jazz under David Baker and classical piano under John Ogdon. In college, he performed professionally with Slide Hampton and Red Rodney and was in a bar band whose members included Jon Herington, Shawn Pelton, Kenny Aronoff, Robert Hurst, and Chris Botti. His musical influences in college were Herbie Hancock, Wynton Kelly, and Prince.

Professional musician
Beard moved to New York in 1985 and became a touring member of John McLaughlin's Mahavishnu Orchestra, started working relationships with Bill Evans and Mike Stern and had recorded with Dave Liebman. He also began producing many successful recordings for artists such as Mike Stern, Bob Berg, Evans and Eliane Elias. In 1986 he began a working relationship with Wayne Shorter that lasted until 2000. In 1988 he became a member of John Scofield's band and toured the world with Pat Metheny from 1992–1993.

During his early New York period he wrote compositions for  Michael Brecker and John McLaughlin. Many of Beard's compositions have been recorded by top jazz artists, for example "The Wait" by John McLaughlin; "Riddle Me This" by Bob Berg; "In the Hat" by Victor Bailey; "Ode to the Doo Da Day", "Quiet City" and "The Gentleman and Hizcaine" by Michael Brecker and "I'll Miss You" by Bill Evans.

He has worked in the studio and on stage with Victor Bailey, Rosa Passos, Toninho Horta, Ralph Bowen, Jon Herington, Steve Vai, Madeleine Peyroux, John Mayer, Walter Becker, Richard Bona, Esperanza Spalding, Steely Dan, Meshell Ndegeocello, Al Jarreau, Dizzy Gillespie. Chris Botti, David Sanborn, Béla Fleck, Larry Carlton, Vince Mendoza and Kenny Garrett taking on musical responsibilities that range from playing piano to programming computer sequencer music to producing.

Albums and awards
Beard's albums include Song of the Sun (1990) that featuring Wayne Shorter and Michael Brecker, Lost at the Carnival in 1995, Truly in 1997, Advocate in 2000, Revolutions in 2008, Show of Hands in 2013 and "Chunks and Chairknobs" in 2019.

His music productions and compositions have been nominated for seven Grammy Awards. He won a Grammy in 2007 as a featured performer on Some Skunk Funk (Randy and Michael Brecker).

Teaching 
Jim Beard has taught at Berklee College of Music in Boston, the Mason Gross School of the Arts at Rutgers University, the Sibelius Academy in Helsinki, Finland, and the Aaron Copland School of Music in New York. He has taught graduate-level arranging and composing, improvisation, applied piano, ensemble and has also been juror and mentor for doctoral students.

Discography 
 Song of the Sun (CTI, 1990)
 Lost at the Carnival (Lipstick, 1994)
 Truly (Escapade, 1997)
 Advocate (JVC Victor, 1999)
 Revolutions (Intuition, 2008)
 Show of Hands (Sunnyside, 2013)
 "Chunks and Chairknobs" (Jazzline, 2019)

See also
 Lyle Mays
 Russell Ferrante
 Joe Zawinul
 List of Jazz Arrangers

References

External links
 Official site
  Interview at Jazz Dimensions, 1999

1960 births
Living people
Musicians from Philadelphia
Jazz fusion pianists
Post-bop pianists
Grammy Award winners
Mahavishnu Orchestra members
21st-century pianists
Sunnyside Records artists
CTI Records artists
Ridley High School alumni
The Dukes of September members